The Kudmi are a community in the states of Jharkhand, West Bengal, Odisha and Bihar of India. They were primarily agriculturalist. .

Classification 
Kudmi were classified as a Notified Tribe by the British Raj under the terms of the Indian Succession Act introduced in 1865 as they have customary rules of succession. Subsequently, in 1913, they were classified as a Primitive tribe. Then they were omitted from the list of communities listed as tribes in the 1931 census. Again, they were omitted from the Scheduled Tribe list drawn up in 1950. In 2004, the Government of Jharkhand recommended that they should be listed as a Scheduled Tribe rather than Other Backward Class. The Tribal Research Institute of Government of India recommended against this proposal, claiming they are a sub-caste of the Kunbi and thus different to tribal people. Therefore, In 2015, the Government of India refused to approve the recommendation of Jharkhand government to list the Kudmi Mahato as Schedule Tribe. They are included in the list of Other Backward Class in the States of Jharkhand, West Bengal and Odisha.

Culture
The traditional occupation of Kudmi is agriculture. The language of Kudmi is Kurmali. The Kudmi people once spoke a distinct language, neither Munda nor Dravidian but also not Indo-Aryan, and at some point switched to the regional Indo-Aryan lingua franca of that time, leaving a distinct substrate in their new language. 

Chait Parab, Karam, Jitiya, Badna, Tusu are the major festival of Kudmi. They worship Budhabaap in Madapthan and Garam at gramthan. Jhumar and Chhau are their folk dance.

See also 
Sadan people
Mahto

Notes

References

Sources

 
 
 

Social groups of Jharkhand
Other Backward Classes
Social groups of Odisha
Social groups of West Bengal